Uralite Halt (TQ 702 737  ) was a halt between Milton Range Halt and Cliffe station on the Hundred of Hoo Railway. Built to serve the British Uralite works, it opened in July 1906 and closed on 4 December 1961. The halt was demolished soon after closure.

References

Sources

External links
 Subterranea Britannica
 Kent Rail
 Uralite Halt station on navigable 1940 O. S. map

Disused railway stations in Kent
Former South Eastern Railway (UK) stations
Railway stations in Great Britain opened in 1906
Railway stations in Great Britain closed in 1961
Transport in Medway